SM CDO Downtown Premier (formerly known as: SM CDO2 Premier according to concept art) is a shopping mall located along Claro M. Recto Avenue corner Osmeña Street, Cagayan de Oro, in the city's central business district. It is owned and operated by SM Prime Holdings, the largest mall operator in the Philippines, and opened on May 12, 2017. The mall is the 2nd in Northern Mindanao and 61st mall in the Philippines by the SM Group. It is the 3rd SM Supermall to be called "Premier" after SM Lanang Premier and SM Aura Premier respectively. It has a leasable area of 81,133 m2 and a gross floor area of 177,743 m2, making it the largest SM Supermall in Mindanao.

History
SM Prime Holdings President Hans Sy had previously disclosed that the site of the old Coca-Cola Plant along C.M. Recto Avenue cor. Pres. Osmeña Sts. will be developed into another SM mall. The mall would be originally called it SM CDO2 Premier (as seen in the concept art of the mall) because it was the 2nd SM mall in the CDO area. But since the old Coke plant is located in downtown CDO, the company decided that the mall will be called: SM CDO Downtown Premier and be the second SM Mall in Cagayan de Oro.

Construction of the mall started in March 2015. On March 15, 2017, tenant partners, retailers, food chains, service centers and merchants attended the tenant's preview of SM CDO Downtown Premier. On the same day, it was announced that the mall had an 85% occupancy rate.

On May 11, the mall held a blessing, mass and ribbon cutting, headed by City Mayor Oscar Moreno and some City officials; Hans T. Sy, Felicidad Sy and Jeffrey Lim, SM Executives; and Archbishop Antonio Ledesma, SJ. Shops were opened on that day for the invited guests. On May 12, SM CDO Downtown Premier opened its doors to the public opening only four levels of the mall with an 87% occupancy rate.

On the mall's opening day, SM Cinema only opened  2 regular cinemas (Cinemas 3 & 4), and a large-format cinema (Megascreen). On May 30, it finally opened the two Director's Club Cinemas and the two other regular cinemas (Cinemas 1 & 2), opening all of its 7 cinemas to moviegoers.

On June 9, almost a month after the mall's opening, SM opened the fifth level of the mall, making all levels open to the public. The opening was attended by City Mayor Oscar Moreno, together with some city officials, as well as some SM officials. The fifth level consists of shops, homegrown restaurants, along with the Sky Garden and Sky Hall. The Sky Hall is still closed to the public. The first bowling center in Northern Mindanao opened on the 5th level as well nearly two years later on May 4, 2019.

On October 17, 2018, the BPO tower is finally open for leasing.

Features

The five-storey mall features anchor stores like The SM Store with three levels of shopping space, SM Supermarket, SM Bowling, and SM Cinemas, with seven theaters. It has service centers, specialty stores and restaurants and indoor parking spaces.

Underneath the mall is a rainwater catchment basin measuring 75 x 40 meters floor area and as high as 6 meters which can hold up to 13,650 cubic meters of water to reduce the risk of flooding.

One of the mall's main attractions is the first-ever large-screen format theater in the city, called Megascreen, equipped with a Christie 6P laser projection system that produces the brightest images and most accurate reproduction of colors from the actual movie set and uses Dolby Atmos Sound System on Christie Vive Speakers, along with two Director's Club theaters for extraordinary cinema comfort and four digital cinemas offering 2D and 3D technologies to movie-goers.

The mall also features a bowling center, a food hall, a sky hall with 800 seats, an al fresco dining and entertainment Sky Garden, and a central architectural feature called "Glass Curtain" which brings much of the natural light into the mall structure, and reflects lights from incoming cars on the CM Recto and Osmeña roads. This creates an effect that lights are falling down to a water fountain below it, leading to the main entrance.

DSGN Associates, an award-winning architectural firm based in Texas, United States, designed the mall.

CDO Downtown Tower 
The BPO tower is located along Osmeña St. The tower is a 12-storey building with helipad and 8 levels of office spaces for BPO companies, as well as the Northern Mindanao regional office of the Department of Foreign Affairs. The BPO tower is now open for leasing after its launch on October 17, 2018.

See also
SM City CDO Uptown
SM Lanang Premier
SM Supermalls
List of largest shopping malls in the world
List of largest shopping malls in the Philippines
List of shopping malls in the Philippines

References

External links
 SM Supermalls

Shopping malls in Cagayan de Oro
Shopping malls established in 2017
SM Prime
Buildings and structures in Cagayan de Oro